NCIS or N.C.I.S. may refer to:

Law enforcement
 National Criminal Intelligence Service, the predecessor to the Serious Organised Crime Agency of the United Kingdom
 Naval Criminal Investigative Service, a United States law enforcement and intelligence agency that primarily investigates crimes in the U.S. Navy and Marine Corps
 National Criminal Investigation Service (Kripos), a special agency of the Norwegian Police Service

Television
 NCIS (franchise)
 NCIS (TV series), since 2003, a United States television show about a group of fictional agents of the Naval Criminal Investigative Service based in Washington, DC
 NCIS (soundtrack), four soundtracks of music featured on the original NCIS TV series
 NCIS: Los Angeles, a 2009 spin-off from NCIS, a show about fictional undercover NCIS Office of Special Projects agents based in Los Angeles
 NCIS: New Orleans, a 2014 second spin-off from NCIS, a show about fictional NCIS agents based in New Orleans
 NCIS: Hawaiʻi, a 2021 third spin-off from NCIS, a show about fictional NCIS agents based in Hawaii

Other uses
 National Coalition of Independent Scholars
 NATO Common Interoperability Standards
 Nothing's Carved in Stone, a Japanese rock band formed in 2009

See also
 National Crime Information Center (NCIC)
 NSIS (disambiguation)
JAG (disambiguation)